Robert Bert Smith (born December 28, 1945) is a former American football defensive back who played one season with the Houston Oilers of the American Football League. He was drafted by the Oilers in the sixteenth round of the 1968 NFL Draft. He played college football at Miami University and attended Hughes STEM High School in Cincinnati, Ohio.

References

External links
Just Sports Stats

Living people
1945 births
Players of American football from West Virginia
American football defensive backs
Miami RedHawks football players
Houston Oilers players
People from Williamson, West Virginia
American Football League players